Kustav Aleksander Kurg (born Gustav Aleksander Kurg; 3 March 1902 Kallavere – 27 November 1992 Toronto, Canada) was an Estonian lawyer and politician. He was a member of VI Riigikogu (its Chamber of Deputies).

References

1902 births
1992 deaths
Members of the Estonian National Assembly
Farmers' Assemblies politicians
Members of the Riigivolikogu
20th-century Estonian lawyers
Estonian World War II refugees
Estonian emigrants to Canada
University of Tartu alumni
People from Jõelähtme Parish